Agyrta porphyria is a moth of the subfamily Arctiinae. It was described by Pieter Cramer in 1782. It is found in Brazil (Para).

Subspecies
Agyrta porphyria porphyria
Agyrta porphyria rothschildi Druce, 1915

References

Moths described in 1782
Arctiinae
Moths of South America